The 1997 Britannic Assurance County Championship was the 98th officially organised running of the County Championship. Glamorgan won the Championship.

Table
Points awarded:
Win: 16 points.
Draw: 3 points.
Draw with scores level (DrT): 8 points.
Draw in one-innings game (Dr1): 8 points.
Abandoned: 3 points.

References

1997 in English cricket
County Championship seasons
Welsh cricket in the 20th century